Sima Yi (179–251) was a general, politician and regent of the state of Cao Wei (220–266) in the Three Kingdoms period (220–280) in China. Two of his sons, Sima Shi (208–255) and Sima Zhao (211–265), rose to power in the 250s and consecutively served as regents throughout the reigns of the last three Wei emperors. After Sima Zhao died in September 265, his son Sima Yan (236–290) forced the last Wei ruler, Cao Huan (246–303), to abdicate the throne in his favour in February 266, ending the Wei regime and establishing the Jin dynasty (266–420). This article contains the family trees of Sima Yi, his brothers, and their descendants up to Sima Yan's generation. For more details on the family trees of the Jin emperors (Sima Yan's generation and beyond), see Chinese emperors family tree (early)#Jin Dynasty and Chu.

Sima Fang and earlier

Sima Fang had eight sons (ranked in decreasing order of seniority) – Sima Lang, Sima Yi, Sima Fu, Sima Kui, Sima Xun, Sima Jin, Sima Tong and Sima Min – who were collectively known as the "Eight Das" because their courtesy names all contained the Chinese character da (達). Sima Fang's father was Sima Jun (司馬儁). Sima Jun's father was Sima Liang. Sima Liang's father was Sima Jun (司馬鈞). Sima Jun (司馬鈞) was an eighth-generation descendant of Sima Ang. Sima Ang descended from Cheng Boxiufu. Cheng Boxiufu was a descendant of Chongli, a son of Gaoyang.

Sima Lang

Sima Lang's son was Sima Yi. Sima Lang's younger brother, Sima Fu, allowed his son Sima Wang to be Sima Lang's successor. Sima Wang was succeeded by his son Sima Hong.

Sima Yi

Sima Yi had four wives: Zhang Chunhua, Lady Fu, Lady Zhang and Lady Bai. Zhang Chunhua bore him three sons and a daughter: Sima Shi, Sima Zhao, Sima Gan and Princess Nanyang (personal name unknown). Princess Nanyang married Xun Yun's son Xun Yi. Xun Yun was Xun Yu's son. Lady Fu bore him four sons: Sima Liang, Sima Zhou, Sima Jing and Sima Jun. Lady Zhang bore him a son, Sima Rong. Lady Bai bore him another son, Sima Lun. Sima Yi had another daughter – Princess Gaolingxuan (personal name unknown) – who was married to Du Yu. The identity of Princess Gaolingxuan's mother is not known.

Sima Rong had no son. He was succeeded by Sima Xi (司馬禧), a son of Sima Zhou's son Sima Dan. Sima Jing died early (presumably without a male heir) and was succeeded by Sima Zhao's son Sima Ji.

Sima Shi

Sima Shi had three wives: Xiahou Hui, Lady Wu (personal name unknown) and Yang Huiyu.

Lady Wu was Wu Zhi's daughter.

Yang Huiyu was the daughter of Yang Chen and Lady Cai. She had two brothers: Yang Cheng (elder) and Yang Hu (younger). Yang Chen's father was Yang Xu. Lady Cai had a sister, Cai Wenji, and their father was Cai Yong. Yang Huiyu did not have any sons with Sima Shi. It is not known if she bore him any daughters.

Xiahou Hui was the daughter of Xiahou Shang and the Lady of Deyang District (personal name unknown). Her brother was Xiahou Xuan. The Lady of Deyang District was Cao Zhen's younger sister. Xiahou Hui bore Sima Shi five daughters but no sons. One of the five daughters was married to Zhen De but she died early. The names of the five daughters are not known.

Sima Zhao

Sima Zhao had nine sons and two daughters. Five of his sons – Sima Yan, Sima You, Sima Zhao, Sima Dingguo and Sima Guangde – were born to his wife Wang Yuanji, but only the two eldest survived childhood. Wang Yuanji also bore him a daughter – Princess Jingzhao, whose personal name is unknown. Princess Jingzhao married Zhen De after Zhen's first wife (Sima Shi's daughter) died early. Wang Yuanji's father was Wang Su. Wang Su's father was Wang Lang. Sima Zhao's four other sons – Sima Jian, Sima Ji, Sima Yongzuo and Sima Yanzuo – were not born to Wang Yuanji. Sima Yongzuo and Sima Yanzuo both died young. The identities of their mothers are unknown. Sima Zhao's other daughter, Princess Changshan, married Wang Ji (王濟), a grandson of Wang Chang. The identity of her mother is also unknown.

Sima Gan

Sima Gan had two sons: Sima Guang and Sima Yong.

Sima Liang

Sima Liang had five sons: Sima Sui, Sima Ju, Sima Yang, Sima Zong and Sima Xi.

Sima Zhou

Sima Zhou married Lady Zhuge, Zhuge Dan's daughter. They had four sons: Sima Jin, Sima Dan, Sima Yao and Sima Cui. Sima Dan's wife, Lady Guo, was a sister-in-law of Empress Jia Nanfeng. Sima Jin's wife was Xiahou Guangji. Xiahou Guangji was the daughter of Xiahou Zhuang, the son of Xiahou Wei and a grandson of Xiahou Yuan.

Sima Jun

Sima Jun had ten sons, among whom the most notable ones are Sima Chang and Sima Xin. The names of the other eight sons are not recorded in history.

Sima Lun

Sima Lun had four sons: Sima Kua, Sima Fu, Sima Qian and Sima Xu.

Sima Fu

Sima Fu had nine sons: Sima Yong (Zikui), Sima Wang, Sima Fu (Prince Cheng of Taiyuan), Sima Yi, Sima Huang, Sima Gui (Ziquan), Sima Gui (Zizhang), Sima Heng and Sima Jing.

Sima Gui (Ziquan)'s son was Sima Yong.

Sima Gui (Zizhang) had no son. He was succeeded by his nephew Sima Ji, a son of Sima Fu (Prince Cheng of Taiyuan).

Sima Heng had no son. He was succeeded by his nephew Sima Dun, the fourth son of Sima Yong (Zikui).

Sima Jing's son was Sima Tao.

Sima Fu (Prince Cheng of Taiyuan)'s son was Sima Hong.

Sima Yi (Zishi) was succeeded by his nephew Sima Cheng, a son of Sima Yong (Zikui).

Sima Yong

Sima Yong (Zikui)'s son was Sima Chong. Sima Chong had a younger brother, Sima Long.

Sima Wang

Sima Wang succeeded his uncle Sima Lang. He had four sons: Sima Yi, Sima Hong, Sima Zheng and Sima Mao.

Sima Huang

Sima Huang had two sons: Sima Pou and Sima Chuo.

Sima Kui

Sima Kui had three sons: Sima Quan, Sima Tai and Sima Sui. Sima Quan's son was Sima Zhi. Sima Tai had four sons: Sima Yue, Sima Teng, Sima Lue and Sima Mo. Sima Sui's son was Sima Xiao.

Sima Xun

Sima Xun's son was Sima Sui. Sima Sui had two sons: Sima Dan and Sima Ji.

Sima Jin

Sima Jin had two sons: Sima Xun and Sima Mu. Sima Xun had two sons: Sima Sui and Sima Cheng. Sima Mu's son was Sima Wei.

Sima Tong

Sima Tong had three sons: Sima Ling, Sima Shun and Sima Bin. Sima Ling's son was Sima Ji. Sima Bin's son was Sima Yin.

See also
 Chinese emperors family tree (early)#Jin dynasty and Chu
 Cao Wei family trees
 Shu Han family trees
 Eastern Wu family trees

References

 Chen, Shou. Records of the Three Kingdoms (Sanguozhi).
 Fang, Xuanling. Book of Jin (Jin Shu).
 Li, Fang. Taiping Yulan.
 Pei, Songzhi. Annotations to Records of the Three Kingdoms (Sanguozhi zhu).
 Wei, Shou. Book of Wei (Wei Shu).
 Yao, Silian. Book of Chen (Chen Shu).

Jin dynasty (266–420)
Dynasty genealogy